Allium fimbriatum is a species of wild onion known by the common name fringed onion. It is native to California and Baja California.

The fringed onion grows from a reddish-brown bulb one to two centimeters wide and sends up a naked brown or green stem. Atop the stem is an inflorescence of up to 75 flowers, each just under a centimeter wide on average. The flowers are variable in color, from pink to purple and often with white areas. The tepals are also variable in shape, from narrow and pointy to spade-shaped.

Varieties
Numerous names have been proposed for subspecies and varieties, most of them now regarded as distinct species. The following are accepted by the World Checklist.
 Allium fimbriatum var. denticulatum Ownbey & Aase ex Traub 
 Allium fimbriatum var. fimbriatum 
 Allium fimbriatum var. mohavense Jeps. 
 Allium fimbriatum var. purdyi (Eastw.) Ownbey ex McNeal

References

External links
 CalFlora Database: Allium fimbriatum (Fringed onion,  Wild onion)
Jepson eFlora (TJM2) treatment
UC Calphotos gallery

fimbriatum
Flora of California
Flora of Baja California
Flora of the California desert regions
Natural history of the California chaparral and woodlands
Natural history of the California Coast Ranges
Natural history of the Mojave Desert
Natural history of the Peninsular Ranges
Natural history of the Transverse Ranges
Plants described in 1879
Taxa named by Sereno Watson
Flora without expected TNC conservation status